Strike Witches is an anime series released as part of a mixed media project by Fumikane Shimada, which also includes light novels and manga. Taking place in an alternate Earth in the 1940s, the series focuses on the 501st Joint Fighter Wing of Strike Witches, magically powered girls who fight against an alien race known as the Neuroi. An original video animation was produced by Gonzo and directed by Kunihisa Sugishima and released in Japan in January 2007. The first season of the anime television series was directed by Kazuhiro Takamura and also produced by Gonzo aired from July to September 2008. The series was also streamed with English subtitles on YouTube, BOST TV and Crunchyroll. The uncensored DVDs were released in September 2008 and January 2009. The series was licensed by Funimation and was released in a complete box set in North America in March 2010. The second season, titled Strike Witches 2, was produced by AIC and again directed by Takamura. It was broadcast in Japan from July to September 2010. It was also simulcast on Crunchyroll and Funimation's anime portal. This series was also licensed by Funimation and released on Blu-ray Disc and DVD in North America in October 2012. A film adaptation was released in March 2012. An original video animation series produced by Silver Link, Operation Victory Arrow, began release in September 2014. A third season of the Strike Witches series, titled Strike Witches: Road to Berlin, aired from October to December 2020.

Four pieces of theme music were used for the series. The second series' opening theme is  performed by Ishida, while the ending theme is "Over Sky" which is performed by the vocal cast. For the OVA series, the opening theme is "Connect Link" performed once again by Ishida, while the ending theme is "Fly away" performed by the vocal cast.

Television series

Strike Witches (2008)

Strike Witches 2 (2010)

Strike Witches: 501st Joint Fighter Wing Take Off! (2019)

Strike Witches: Road to Berlin (2020)

World Witches Take Off! (2021)

Luminous Witches (2022)

Original video animation

Pilot OVA (2007)

Strike Witches: Operation Victory Arrow (2014)

Strike Witches: The Movie (2012)

See also
Strike Witches
List of Strike Witches characters
List of Brave Witches episodes - 2016 anime featuring a different set of characters

Notes

References

External links

Strike Witches